Luperón may refer to: 
 Gregorio Luperón, a president of the Dominican Republic in the 19th century
 Luperón, Dominican Republic, a town on the northern coast of the Dominican Republic
 Gregorio Luperón International Airport, an airport in the northern Dominican Republic
 Gregorio Luperón metro station, a metro station in Santo Domingo
 Gregorio Luperón High School for Math & Science, a high school in New York City